Frank Drmic (born 7 February 1978) is an Australian professional basketball player.

Playing career

Born in Melbourne, Victoria, Drmic held an Australian Institute of Sport scholarship 1994–1995. His career began in the Australian National Basketball League – NBL in 1996, playing with the NBL South East Melbourne Magic. In his rookie season with the NBL South East Melbourne Magic, they won the National Basketball League Championship. Drmic and the NBL South East Melbourne Magic also competed in the 1997 National Basketball League Grand Final Series.

One of his greatest achievements was winning gold whilst representing Australia at the 1997 U23 World Championships. In 1997 he received the Junior Male Player of the Year Award from Basketball Australia. In 1998 he was selected to represent Australia at the FIBA World Championships in Greece and won silver at the Goodwill Games in New York City.

Seasons 1998–2000 he signed with the NBL Victoria Titans and played in the National Basketball League Grand Final Series for the 1998–1999, 1999–2000 championships. Drmic signed with the NBL Sydney Kings for the 2000–2002 seasons.

During 2002–2005 he played throughout Europe in the A1 Ethniki Greek Basketball League, Russian Basketball Super League, BLB Belgium Basketball League, the second French division and BBL Basketball Bundesliga. In 2004 whilst playing in the BBL Basketball Bundesliga League he finished the season as the leading 3pt percentage shooter.

Drmic returned to the Australian National Basketball League in 2006 and signed with the NBL South Dragons.

His younger brother, Anthony Drmic, was a player for the Boise State University Broncos basketball team, and now plays for the Adelaide 36ers in the NBL.

Awards
1997 – Basketball Australia Junior Male Player of the Year Award

References

External links

1978 births
Living people
Australian expatriate basketball people in Belgium
Australian expatriate basketball people in Germany
Australian expatriate basketball people in Greece
Australian men's basketball players
Australian Institute of Sport basketball players
EWE Baskets Oldenburg players
Forwards (basketball)
Near East B.C. players
Spirou Charleroi players
South Dragons players
South East Melbourne Magic players
Basketball players from Melbourne
Sydney Kings players
Victoria Titans players
1998 FIBA World Championship players
Competitors at the 1998 Goodwill Games